Viggo Christensen (29 April 1880–9 August 1967) was the first Lord Mayor of Copenhagen, holding that office from 1938 to 1946 for the Social Democratic Party.  From 1917 to 1938, he held the office of mayor of the social area in Copenhagen, Denmark.

Viggo Christensen was educated as a typographer in 1899.

References

Article from Mariagerfjord Library (in Danish)
Dansk biografisk haandleksikon bind 1 (1920) , pp. 309-310.

1880 births
1967 deaths
Politicians from Copenhagen
Mayors of places in Denmark
Social Democrats (Denmark) politicians